Enrico Berlinguer (25 May 1922 – 11 June 1984) was an Italian politician, considered the most popular leader of the Italian Communist Party (PCI), which he led as the national secretary from 1972 until his death during a tense period in Italy's history, marked by the Years of Lead and social conflicts, such as the Hot Autumn of 1969–1970.

During his leadership, he distanced the party from the influence of the Communist Party of the Soviet Union and pursued a moderate line, repositioning the party within Italian politics and advocating accommodation and national unity. This strategy came to be termed Eurocommunism, and he was seen as its main spokesperson. It came to be adopted by Western Europe's other significant like-minded parties, such as the Communist Party of Spain and later the French Communist Party; its significance as a political force was cemented by a 1977 meeting in Madrid between Berlinguer, Georges Marchais, and Santiago Carrillo. Berlinguer described his alternative model of socialism, distinct from both the Soviet bloc and the capitalism practiced by Western countries during the Cold War, as terza via; his usage of the term has no relation to the more centrist Third Way practiced by subsequent Prime Ministers Romano Prodi and Matteo Renzi.

Under Berlinguer, the PCI reached the height of its success, winning significant victories in the country's regional and local elections in 1975, and 34% of the vote in the 1976 Italian general election, its highest share of the vote and number of seats. With these gains, he negotiated the Historic Compromise with Christian Democracy (DC), lending support to their government in exchange for consultation on policy decisions, as well as social reforms. He took a firm stand against terrorism after the kidnapping and murder of Aldo Moro, and used the PCI's influence to steer Italian labour unions towards moderating wage demands to cope with the country's severe inflation rate after the 1973 oil crisis. These stands were not reciprocated with sufficient concessions from Giulio Andreotti's government, leading the PCI to leave the coalition in 1979. The combination of austerity advocacy, hard line against the Red Brigades, and attempts at an accommodation with the DC affected the PCI's vote at the 1979 Italian general election and the compromise was ultimately ended in 1980. The PCI remained in national opposition for the rest of Berlinguer's tenure, retaining a solid core of support at the 1983 Italian general election; its main strength from that point would remain at the regional and local level.

Berlinguer had an austere and modest but charismatic personality, and despite the difficulties that confronted the PCI during the Historic Compromise, he remained a popular politician, respected for his principles, conviction, and bold stands. He characterised the PCI as an honest party in Italy's corruption-ravaged politics, an image that preserved the party's reputation during the Mani pulite corruption scandals. He was characterised by Patrick McCarthy as "the last great communist leader in Western Europe", and remains identified with the causes of Eurocommunism, opposition to Soviet repression in Eastern Europe, and democratic change in Italy.

Early political career

The son of Mario Berlinguer and Maria Loriga, Enrico Berlinguer was born in Sassari on 25 May 1922 to a noble Sardinian family in a notable cultural context, with family ties and political contacts that would heavily influence his life and career. His surname is of Catalan origin, a reminder of the period when Sardinia was part of the dominions of the Crown of Aragon.

He was a second cousin of Francesco Cossiga (who was a leader of Christian Democracy and later became President of the Italian Republic) and both were relatives of Antonio Segni, another Christian Democrat leader and President of the Republic. His maternal grandfather, Giovanni Loriga, and Francesco Cossiga's maternal grandfather, Antonio Zanfarino, were half-brothers on their mother side. Enrico's grandfather, Enrico Berlinguer Sr., was the founder of the Sardinian newspaper La Nuova Sardegna and a personal friend of Giuseppe Garibaldi and Giuseppe Mazzini, whom he had helped in his attempts through his parliamentary work to improve the sad conditions on the island.

In 1937, Berlinguer had his first contacts with Sardinian anti-fascists and formally entered the Italian Communist Party (PCI) in 1943, soon becoming the secretary of the Sassari section. The following year a riot exploded in the town and he was involved in the disorders and arrested, but was discharged after three months of prison.

Immediately after his detention ended, his father brought him to Salerno, the town in which the Royal family and the government had taken refuge after the armistice between Italy and the Allies. In Salerno, his father introduced him to Palmiro Togliatti, the most important leader of the Communist Party.

Togliatti sent Berlinguer back to Sardinia to prepare for his political career. At the end of 1944, Togliatti appointed him to the national secretariat of the Communist Organisation for Youth (FGCI). As a secretary of the FGCI, Berlinguer at one point presented Maria Goretti as an example for activists. He was soon sent to Milan, and he was appointed to the Central Committee as a member in 1945.

In 1946, Togliatti became the national secretary (the highest political position) of the PCI and called Berlinguer to Rome, where his talents let him enter the national leadership only two years later (at the age of 26, one of the youngest members ever admitted). In 1949, he was named national secretary of the FGCI, a post he held until 1956. The following year in 1950, he became president of the World Federation of Democratic Youth, an international anti-fascist youth organisation. In 1957, Berlinguer, as a member of the central school of the PCI, abolished the obligatory visit to the Soviet Union, including political training there, that until then had been necessary for admission to the highest positions in the PCI.

Secretary of the Communist Party
Berlinguer's career was obviously carrying him towards the highest positions in the party. After having held many responsible posts, in 1968 he was elected a deputy for the first time for the electoral district of Rome. The following year, he was elected deputy national secretary of the party (the secretary being Luigi Longo). In this role, he took part in the 1969 international conference of the communist parties in Moscow, where his delegation disagreed with the "official" political line and refused to support the final report.

Berlinguer's unexpected stance made waves: he gave the strongest speech by a major communist leader ever heard in Moscow. He refused to "excommunicate" the Chinese communists and directly told Leonid Brezhnev that the invasion of Czechoslovakia by the Warsaw Pact countries (which he termed the "tragedy in Prague") had made clear the considerable differences within the communist movement on fundamental questions such as national sovereignty, socialist democracy and the freedom of culture.

Already a prominent leader in the party, Berlinguer was elected to the position of national secretary in 1972 when Luigi Longo resigned on grounds of ill health. In 1973, having been hospitalized after a car accident during a visit to Bulgaria (now widely considered an attempt on his life on orders from Moscow), Berlinguer wrote three famous articles ("Reflections on Italy", "After the facts of Chile" and "After the Coup [in Chile]") for the intellectual weekly magazine of the party, Rinascita. In these, he presented the strategy of the so-called Historic Compromise, a proposed coalition between the Italian Communist Party and the Christian Democrats to grant Italy a period of political stability, at a time of severe economic crisis and in a context in which some forces were allegedly manoeuvering for a coup d'état in Italy.

International relations

The following year in Belgrade, Berlinguer met with Yugoslav president Josip Broz Tito, with a view to further developing his relationships with the major communist parties of Europe, Asia and Africa. In 1976, Berlinguer confirmed the autonomous position of the PCI vis-à-vis the Soviet Communist Party. Before 5,000 communist delegates in Moscow, he spoke of a "pluralistic system" (translated by the interpreter as "multiform"), referring to the PCI's intentions to build "a socialism that we believe necessary and possible only in Italy".

When Berlinguer finally secured the PCI's condemnation of any kind of "interference", the rupture with the Soviets was effectively complete (although the party still for some years received money from Moscow). Since Italy was suffering the "interference" of NATO, the Soviets said it seemed that the only interference that the Italian Communists could not suffer was the Soviet one. In an interview with Corriere della Sera, Berlinguer declared that he felt "safer under NATO's umbrella". Berlinguer's acceptance of NATO did not dent U.S. suspicion of him: appearing on the cover of Time on 14 June 1976, he was named "The Red Threat".

In 1977 at a meeting in Madrid between Berlinguer, Santiago Carrillo of the Spanish Communist Party, and Georges Marchais of the French Communist Party, the fundamental lines of Eurocommunism were laid out. A few months later, Berlinguer was again in Moscow, where he gave another speech which was poorly received by his hosts and published by Pravda only in a censored version.

Domestic politics

Moving step by step, Berlinguer was building a consensus in the PCI towards a rapprochement with other components of society. After the surprising opening of 1970 toward conservatives and the still discussed proposal of the Historic Compromise, he published a correspondence with Monsignor Luigi Bettazzi, the Bishop of Ivrea; and it was an astonishing event since Pope Pius XII had excommunicated the communists soon after World War II and the possibility of any relationship between communists and Catholics seemed very unlikely.

This act also served to counteract the allegation, commonly and popularly expressed, that the PCI was protecting leftist terrorists, in the harshest years of terrorism in Italy. In this context, the PCI opened its doors to many Catholics and a debate started about the possibility of contact. Notably, Berlinguer's strictly Catholic family was not brought out of its strictly respected privacy. In the general election of June 1976, the PCI gained 34.4% of the vote.

In Italy, a "government of national solidarity" was ruling, but Berlinguer said that in an emergency government a strong and powerful cabinet to solve a crisis of exceptional gravity was needed. On 16 March 1978, Aldo Moro, President of the Christian Democratic Party, was kidnapped by the Red Brigades, a Marxist-Leninist terrorist group, on the day that the new government was going to be sworn in before parliament.

During this crisis, Berlinguer adhered to the Front of Firmness (fermezza), refusing to negotiate with terrorists, who had proposed to liberate Moro in exchange for the release of some imprisoned terrorists. Despite the PCI's firm stand against terrorism, the Moro incident left the party more isolated.

In June, the PCI gave its approval and ultimately active support to a campaign against President Giovanni Leone, accused of being involved in the Lockheed bribery scandal. This resulted in the President's resignation. Berlinguer also supported the election of the veteran Socialist Sandro Pertini as President of Italy, but his presidency did not produce the effects that the PCI had hoped for.

In Italy, after a new President is elected, the government resigns. The PCI expected Pertini to use his influence in its favour, but the President was influenced by other political leaders like Giovanni Spadolini of the Italian Republican Party and Bettino Craxi of the Italian Socialist Party; and thus the PCI remained out of the government.

During these years the PCI governed many Italian regions, sometimes more than half of them. Notably, the regional governments of Emilia-Romagna and Tuscany were concrete proof of PCI's governmental capabilities. In this period, Berlinguer turned his attention to the exercise of local power to show that "the trains could run on time" under the PCI. He personally took part in electoral campaigns in the provinces and local councils. While other parties sent only local leaders, this helped the party to win many elections at these levels.

Break with the Soviet Union
In 1980, the PCI publicly condemned the Soviet invasion of Afghanistan and Moscow then immediately sent Georges Marchais to Rome to try to bring Berlinguer into line, but he was received with perceptible coldness. The break with the Soviets and other communist parties became clear when the PCI did not participate in the 1980 international conference of communist parties held in Paris. Instead, Berlinguer made an official visit to China. In November in Salerno, Berlinguer declared that the idea of a possible Historic Compromise had been put aside and it would be replaced with the idea of the "democratic alternative".

In 1981, Berlinguer said that in his personal opinion "the progressive force of the October Revolution had been exhausted". The PCI criticised the "normalisation" of Poland and very soon the PCI's split with the Soviet Communist Party became definitive and official, followed by a long polemic between Pravda and L'Unità (the official newspaper of PCI), not made any milder after a meeting with Fidel Castro in Havana.

Death

Berlinguer's last major statement was a call for the solidarity among the leftist parties. On 7 June 1984 he suffered a brain haemorrhage while giving a speech at a public meeting in Padua. He entered a coma on the same day and died four days later, on 11 June. More than a million people attended his funeral Piazza San Giovanni, the largest funeral in Italy's history at the time. Reflecting his stature in Italian politics, the leaders of all parties paid tribute to his career and even the Vatican expressed condolences. Deputy Soviet leader Gorbachev and Chinese prime minister Zhao Ziyang also attended his funeral.

Berlinguer's death took place six days before Italy's part of the 1984 European Parliament election. The PCI gained a significant sympathy vote as a result, winning the most votes for the only time.

Analysis

Berlinguer has been described in many ways, but he was generally recognised for political coherence and courage, together with a rare personal and political intelligence. A serious and morally rigorous man, he was sincerely respected even by his opponents and his three days' agony was followed with great attention by the general population. His funeral was attended by a large number of people, perhaps among the highest ever seen in Rome. The most important political act of his career in the PCI was undoubtedly the dramatic break with Soviet Communism, the so-called strappo, together with the creation of Eurocommunism and his substantial work towards contact with the moderate (and particularly the Catholic) half of the country.

Berlinguer nevertheless had many enemies. Opposition within the PCI claimed that he had turned a workers' party into a sort of bourgeois revisionist club. External opponents noted that the strappo took several years to be completed: this was seen as evidence that there had been no definitive decision on the point. However, the acceptance of NATO is generally seen as evidence of the genuine autonomy of the PCI's position. Despite notably successful communist local governments, Berlinguer's efforts failed to bring the PCI into government. His final platform, the "democratic alternative", was never realised. Within a decade of his death, the Soviet Union, the Christian Democrats, and the PCI all disappeared, transforming Italian politics beyond recognition.

Impact on Italian society

Italian singer-songwriter Antonello Venditti posthumously dedicated a song, "Dolce Enrico" ("Sweet Enrico"), to Berlinguer.

Italian actor and director Roberto Benigni declared publicly his admiration and personal love for Berlinguer. Besides making him the protagonist of the movie Berlinguer ti voglio bene (Berlinguer, I Love You), Benigni appeared with Berlinguer during a public political demonstration of the Italian Communist Party (of which he was a sympathiser).

Italian folk music band Modena City Ramblers wrote a song about Berlinguer's funeral, "I funerali di Berlinguer", published on their first full-length album, Riportando tutto a casa.

Electoral history

Writings
 Enrico Berlinguer, Antonio Bronda, Stephen Bodington, After Poland, Spokesman, 1982, .

References

Further reading

 Wilsford, David, ed. Political leaders of contemporary Western Europe: a biographical dictionary (Greenwood, 1995), pp 31–44.

External links
 Profile at Camera.it (in Italian)

 
 

1922 births
1984 deaths
Burials at the Cimitero Flaminio
Deputies of Legislature IX of Italy
Deputies of Legislature V of Italy
Deputies of Legislature VI of Italy
Deputies of Legislature VII of Italy
Deputies of Legislature VIII of Italy
Italian Communist Party politicians
Italian atheists
Italian people of Catalan descent
Italian resistance movement members
Neurological disease deaths in Veneto
People from Sassari
Politicians of Sardinia